Paul F. I. Cole (born 11 September 1941) is a British racehorse trainer. Since 1987 he has been based at Whatcombe Estate in Berkshire, the former stables of Dick Dawson and Arthur Budgett.

He was British flat racing Champion Trainer in 1991, the year in which he trained Generous to win the Epsom Derby. Notable owners he has trained for include Prince Fahd bin Salman and Martyn Arbib, and regular jockeys have been Richard Quinn and Alan Munro. In March 2020 Cole took out a joint training licence with his son, Oliver, who had previously been his assistant trainer.

Major wins

 Great Britain
 Ascot Gold Cup – (1) – Mr Dinos (2003)
 Cheveley Park Stakes – (1) – Pass the Peace (1988)
 Derby – (1) – Generous (1991)
 Dewhurst Stakes – (1) – Generous (1990)
 Fillies' Mile – (1) – Culture Vulture (1991)
 King George VI and Queen Elizabeth Stakes – (1) – Generous (1991)
 Lockinge Stakes – (1) – Broken Hearted (1988)
 Nassau Stakes – (2) – Ruby Tiger (1991, 1992)
 St. Leger – (1) – Snurge (1990)
 Sun Chariot Stakes – (1) – Lady in Waiting (1999)
 Yorkshire Oaks – (1) – Bint Pasha (1987)

 Canada
 Canadian International Stakes – (1) – Snurge (1992)
 E. P. Taylor Stakes – (1) – Ruby Tiger (1990)

 France
 Poule d'Essai des Pouliches – (1) – Culture Vulture (1992)
 Prix de la Forêt – (1) – Sarab (1986)
 Prix d'Ispahan – (1) – Zoman (1992)
 Prix Marcel Boussac – (1) – Culture Vulture (1991)
 Prix Royal-Oak – (1) – Mr Dinos (2002)
 Prix de la Salamandre – (1) – John de Coombe (1977)
 Prix Vermeille – (1) – Bint Pasha (1987)

 Germany
 Grosser Preis von Berlin – (1) – Ibn Bey (1990)
 Preis von Europa – (1) – Ibn Bey (1989)

 Ireland
 Irish Derby – (1) – Generous (1991)
 Irish Oaks – (1) – Knight's Baroness (1990)
 Irish St. Leger – (2) – Ibn Bey (1990), Strategic Choice (1995)
 Pretty Polly Stakes – (2) – Bint Pasha (1987), Ruby Tiger (1991)
 Tattersalls Gold Cup – (1) – Zoman (1991)

 Italy
 Derby Italiano – (2) – Zaizoom (1987), Time Star (1994)
 Gran Criterium – (1) – Torrismondo (1993)
 Gran Premio d'Italia – (1) – Posidonas (1995)
 Gran Premio di Milano – (2) – Snurge (1991), Strategic Choice (1996)
 Oaks d'Italia – (1) – Bright Generation (1993)
 Premio Lydia Tesio – (1) – Ruby Tiger (1990)
 Premio Presidente della Repubblica – (1) – Great Palm (1993)

 United States
 Washington, D.C. International Stakes – (1) – Zoman (1992)

References

 NTRA.com

External links
Official website

Living people
1941 births
British racehorse trainers